Gene  Stupnitsky (born August 26, 1977) is a Ukrainian-born American film and television writer and producer. He grew up in the suburbs of Chicago. He usually works with Lee Eisenberg, with whom he founded Quantity Entertainment.

Early life and education
Stupnitsky was born in Kyiv, Ukrainian SSR, Soviet Union (present-day Kyiv, Ukraine) to Jewish parents. He attended Stevenson High School and graduated from the University of Iowa in 2000.

Career

Television
In 2005, Eisenberg and Stupnitsky joined the staff of the NBC comedy series The Office, where they remained from seasons 2 to 6. In addition to writing, he served as a co-executive producer and directed two episodes with Eisenberg, "Michael Scott Paper Company" and "The Lover". Although he is not credited for directing "The Lover", similarly Eisenberg is not credited for directing "Michael Scott Paper Company", as only one person can be credited with directing the episode. They also directed The Outburst, a webisode series for The Office. He also acted as one of the Vance Refrigeration delivery guys (Leo), along with Eisenberg, present in several episodes of The Office. Stupnitsky, alongside Eisenberg, co-wrote two of the most critically acclaimed episodes, including Dinner Party and Scott’s Tots.

In 2013, Eisenberg and Stupnitsky had a busy year in television, and were listed as two of Deadline Hollywoods "Overachievers" of the pilot season. Along with Stephen Merchant, they created, executive produced, and wrote for the HBO series Hello Ladies, which ran for one season and concluded with a feature-length special. That same year, they wrote a pilot for ABC based on the popular BBC series Pulling, in addition to serving as executive producers on the series Trophy Wife, which aired for one season on ABC. They also executive produced the TV series Bad Teacher for CBS, which is based on their original screenplay.

Film
Eisenberg and Stupnitsky have worked together on several screenplays, many of which they have produced as well. Alongside Harold Ramis, they wrote the screenplay for Year One, which starred Jack Black and Michael Cera, and was released in 2009. Following that, they wrote and produced the film Bad Teacher, which starred Cameron Diaz and Justin Timberlake and had worldwide success. They were to serve as producers of a proposed sequel.

Eisenberg and Stupnitsky wrote a screenplay for Ghostbusters III, but it was never produced.

Stupnitsky made his directorial debut with the 2019 comedy hit Good Boys. He most recently shot No Hard Feelings, which he co-wrote and directed. It stars Jennifer Lawrence and is set to hit theaters in June 2023.

FilmographyFilmTelevision'

References

External links
 

1977 births
Living people
Writers from Kyiv
University of Iowa alumni
American people of Ukrainian-Jewish descent
American television writers
American male television writers
Jewish American writers
Ukrainian emigrants to the United States
Ukrainian Jews
Writers Guild of America Award winners
21st-century American Jews